In the study of military tactics, a counter-offensive is a large-scale strategic offensive military operation, usually by forces that had successfully halted the enemy's offensive, while occupying defensive positions. 

The counter-offensive is executed after exhausting the enemy's front line troops and after the enemy reserves had been committed to combat and proven incapable of breaching defenses, but before the enemy has had the opportunity to assume new defensive positions. Sometimes the counter-offensive can be of a more limited operational maneuver nature, with more limited objectives rather than those seeking attainment of a strategic goal. A counter-offensive as considered by Clausewitz to be the most efficient means of forcing the attacker to abandon offensive plans.

Counter-offensives can be executed not only on land, but also by the naval forces and air forces. Strategic counter-offensives have been recorded by military historians in many wars throughout military history. Although not always known as such, because they are usually described by historians in conjunction with the defensive phase, such as the Battle of Moscow.

A counterattack is the tactical and sometimes smaller operational equivalent of the counter-offensive.

Notes

References
 Briggs, Clarence E., (ed.), translated by Oliver L. Spaulding, Roots of Strategy: 3 Military Classics : Von Leeb's Defense, Von Freytag-Loringhoven's the Power of Personality in War, Erfurth's Surprise, Stackpole Books, 1991
 Department of Defense (US); ''Dictionary of Military and Associated Terms. Published by: United States Government Printing Office, Washington, DC. Retrieved: 13 October 2008.

Military strategy
Military tactics
Military terminology
Military theory